Saul Wahl Katzenellenbogen (1541–1617) was a wealthy and politically influential Polish Jew who is said to have briefly occupied the throne of Poland on 18 August 1587. He has historically borne the nickname, "Le roi d'un jour" (king for a day).  

Saul's father was Samuel Judah Katzenellenbogen. Wahl had thirteen children, including the renowned Polish rabbi, Meir Wahl Katzenellenbogen.

Folklore
Saul Wahl’s story has gained a firm place in the folklore of the Jewish people. The version of the story set forth in the Jewish Encyclopedia reads as follows:

At a point in his life, Lithuanian noble Nicholas Radziwill, wishing to do penance for the many atrocities he had committed while a young man, undertook a pilgrimage to Rome in order to consult the pope as to the best means for expiating his sins. The pope advised him to dismiss all his servants and to lead for a few years the life of a wandering beggar. After the expiration of the period prescribed, Radziwill found himself destitute and penniless in Padua, Italy. His appeals for help were heeded by nobody, and his story of being a prince was received with scorn and ridicule. 

He finally decided to appeal to Samuel Judah Katzenellenbogen, the rabbi of Padua. Katzenellenbogen received him with marked respect, treated him very kindly, and provided him with the means to return to Lithuania. When the time for departure came the prince asked the rabbi how he could repay him for his kindness. To allow Radziwill to repay the favour, Shmuel asked that he help find his son Saul, who years before had left to study in a yeshiva in Poland. Upon his return to Poland he inquired at all yeshivas until he found Saul in Brest-Litovsk. Radziwill was impressed with Saul's intellect and offered to board him in his own castle, where Saul could pursue his studies. Radziwill's court personnel were similarly impressed with Saul, and his reputation spread throughout Poland.

When King Stephen Báthory died in 1586, the Poles were divided between wishing to be ruled by the Zamoyski family and the Zborowski. Polish law at that time stated that the throne might not remain unoccupied for any length of time, and that in case electors could not agree upon a king, an outsider should be appointed rex pro tempore (temporary king). Radziwill proposed that Saul Wahl Katzenellenbogen be appointed temporary king, and Wahl was elected to the office. Traditions disagree as to the length of his reign. Some state that he ruled one night only; others make it a few days.

Historicity
Historian Gustav Karpeles writes that "an historical kernel lies hidden in the legend" that, he says, "rests upon an historical substratum". Nicholas Radziwill, he says, made a widely publicized pilgrimage to Jerusalem. While returning, wrote Radziwill, he was attacked in Italy by robbers and was left in Ancona without any money.  His pleas for help were ignored by all except a Jewish merchant, who alone believed his claim that he was a Polish noble. The merchant provided him with funds to return to Poland.  Karpeles concludes that Radziwill's narrative is consistent with the narrative of the Jewish tale and that the lone Jewish merchant who had helped Radziwill was Samuel Judah Katzenellenbogen, Saul Wahl's father.

References 

1541 births
1617 deaths
Legendary Polish monarchs
17th-century Polish businesspeople
Jewish royalty
16th-century Polish Jews
17th-century Polish Jews